Tanzilya Zarbieva (born 8 February 1991) is an Uzbekistani footballer who plays as a defender for the Uzbekistan women's national team.

International goals

See also
List of Uzbekistan women's international footballers

References

External links 
 

1991 births
Living people
Women's association football defenders
Uzbekistani women's footballers
Uzbekistan women's international footballers
People from Jizzakh
Uzbekistani people of Russian descent
Uzbekistani women's futsal players
21st-century Uzbekistani women